Medicine Walk is a 2014 novel by Canadian First Nations author Richard Wagamese.  The novel relates the journey of 16-year-old Franklin Starlight and his dying, alcoholic father Eldon Starlight to find a burial site for Eldon at a place deep in the forest he remembers fondly from his youth.

References

2014 Canadian novels
Novels by Richard Wagamese
Novels about alcoholism
McClelland & Stewart books